The 2021 international cricket season took place from May 2021 to September 2021. 13 Tests, 56 One Day Internationals (ODIs), 45 [[Twenty23
International]]s (T20Is) were scheduled to be held in this season. The final of the 2019–2021 ICC World Test Championship took place in June at the Rose Bowl in Southampton, England, with New Zealand beating India by eight wickets. The 2021–2023 ICC World Test Championship started in August 2021, with India's tour of England.

Qualification for the 2023 ICC Women's T20 World Cup also started, with Scotland hosting the first regional qualifier group in August. Also in women's international cricket, 18 Women's One Day International (WODI) and 23 Women's Twenty20 International (WT20I) matches were scheduled to be played, along with a women's Test match between England and India. Additionally, a number of other T20I/WT20I matches were scheduled to be played in minor series involving associate nations.

The impact of the COVID-19 pandemic continued into the 2021 international calendar. In November 2020, the planned Cricket World Cup Super League fixtures between the Netherlands and England were postponed. The series was originally scheduled to be played in May 2021, but it was moved to May 2022 due to the pandemic. In February 2021, round eight of the ICC Cricket World Cup League 2 tournament, scheduled to take place in Papua New Guinea, was also postponed. In June, the ninth round of the tournament, scheduled to take place in Spain, was postponed until 2022. On 22 July 2021, Cricket Ireland confirmed that their home series against Zimbabwe would be rescheduled due to quarantine requirements needed for the visiting team. Later the same day, the second ODI match between the West Indies and Australia was postponed following a positive COVID-19 case. The Cricket World Cup Challenge League B tournament originally scheduled to be played in Jersey during September, was rescheduled to take place in Hong Kong in December 2021.

In September 2021, the fifth Test match between England and India was cancelled a few hours before the scheduled start, due to COVID-19 cases in the Indian camp. The match was rescheduled to take place in July 2022, ahead of India's white-ball tour of England.

Season overview

Rankings

The following were the rankings at the beginning of the season.

On-going tournaments
The following were the rankings at the beginning of the season.

May

Scotland in Netherlands

Sri Lanka in Bangladesh

The tour was originally scheduled to take place in December 2020, but was moved to May 2021.

Scotland women in Ireland

2021 Papua New Guinea Tri-Nation Series

The series was postponed in February 2021 due to the COVID-19 pandemic.

June

Ireland in Netherlands

New Zealand in England

South Africa in West Indies

India women in England

World Test Championship Final

Sri Lanka in England

Pakistan women in West Indies

July

Bangladesh in Zimbabwe

Pakistan in England

Australia in West Indies

The second ODI was suspended following a positive test for COVID-19 from a non-playing member of the West Indies team. After no further cases, the second and third ODIs were rescheduled.

South Africa in Ireland

India in Sri Lanka

The second T20I was postponed by one day following a positive test for COVID-19 from an Indian cricketer.

2021 Scotland Tri-Nation Series

The series was postponed in June 2021 due to the COVID-19 pandemic.

Netherlands women in Ireland

Pakistan in West Indies

Afghanistan in Sri Lanka

The series was scheduled to start in July 2021, but did not take place. No official updates were issued by either cricket board or the ICC.

August

Australia in Bangladesh

India in England

The fifth Test was cancelled following a number of COVID cases in the Indian camp. In October 2021, the England and Wales Cricket Board announced that the Test match would be played in July 2022.

Zimbabwe in Ireland

The series was postponed in July 2021, with rescheduled dates confirmed in August 2021.

Thailand women in Zimbabwe

South Africa women in West Indies

2021 United States Tri-Nation Series

September

New Zealand women in England

Zimbabwe in Scotland

See also
 Associate international cricket in 2021
 Impact of the COVID-19 pandemic on cricket

Notes

References

2021 in cricket